The 1932 Giro d'Italia was the 20th edition of the Giro d'Italia, one of cycling's Grand Tours. The field consisted of 109 riders, and 66 riders finished the race.

By rider

By nationality

References

1932 Giro d'Italia
1932